Le Fel is a commune in the Aveyron department in southern France.
It is also home to the "Roi du Fel", a notorious korean streamer with over 17k subscribers.

Population

See also
Communes of the Aveyron department

References

Communes of Aveyron
Aveyron communes articles needing translation from French Wikipedia